Jean Lombard (26 September 1854 – 17 July 1891) was a French novelist of the late nineteenth century.

Lombard was born in Toulon, Var.  His work, with its themes of orientalism, androgyny and paganism, had deep affiliations with the Decadent movement in literature. Although almost completely forgotten today, he influenced contemporaries such as Rachilde and Jean Lorrain. His best-known work, based on the Roman emperor Heliogabalus, is L'Agonie (1888); the 1902 reprint included a preface by Octave Mirbeau and illustrations by Auguste Leroux. According to William Sharp, Lombard died in 1891 in poverty, bordering on starvation.

References
Sharp, William. Studies and Appreciations. Duffield & Company, 1912.

External links
Works by Jean Lombard at the Bibliothèque Nationale.
  Octave Mirbeau, « Jean Lombard ».

1854 births
1891 deaths
Writers from Toulon
19th-century French novelists
French male novelists
19th-century French male writers